Bruno N Rémillard (born July 7, 1961) is a Canadian mathematical statistician and an honorary professor at HEC Montréal. He is the 2019 Gold Medalist of the Statistical Society of Canada and was inducted as a 2019 Fellow of the Institute of Mathematical Statistics. Bruno N Rémillard is the current President-Elect of the Statistical Society of Canada.

Biography 

Rémillard was born in Saint-Raphaël, Quebec, Canada. He received a BSc and a MSc in mathematics from Université Laval in 1983 and 1985 and two years later a PhD in probability at Carleton University under the supervision of Donald A. Dawson. His dissertation was entitled "Large deviations and laws of the iterated logarithm for multidimensional diffusion processes with applications to diffusion processes with random coefficients." and earned him the Pierre-Robillard Award from the Statistical Society of Canada that recognizes the best PhD thesis defended in the relevant fields at a Canadian university in a given year. After working as an NSERC postdoctoral fellow at Cornell University, Bruno N Rémillard joined the Université du Québec à Trois-Rivières in 1988. He was promoted to the rank of Associate in 1992 and became full professor in 1996. He settled at HEC Montréal in 2001.

Publications 

Bruno N Rémillard has authored over 85 published papers, mostly in high-caliber international journals, in the fields of probability, statistics, and time series modelling. He has co-authored with Christian Genest nearly 20 papers in The Annals of Probability, The Annals of Statistics,  Bernouilli, Biometrika, Journal of the American Statistical Association, Journal of Multivariate Analysis, etc. He is one of the 23 scientists to have published in the four IMS Annals. He is the author of a graduate monograph and co-authored three undergraduate books:
 Corina Reischer, Raymond Leblanc, Bruno Rémillard, and Denis Larocque, Théorie des probabilités: Problèmes et solutions., Presses de l'Université du Québec, Montréal, Canada, 2002 
 Pierre Duchesne and Bruno Rémillard, Statistical modeling and analysis for complex data problems, GERAD 25th Anniversary Series, Springer: New York, 2005 
 Pierre Del Moral, Bruno Rémillard, and Sylvain Rubenthaler,  Une introduction aux probabilités, Éditions Ellipses, 2006 
 B. Rémillard, Statistical methods for financial engineering, Chapman and Hall/CRC, 2013.

Awards and honors 

 Statistical Society of Canada Pierre-Robillard Award 1988 
 Elected Member of the International Statistical Institute 2000
 Best Paper Award Canadian Journal of Statistics 2003 
 Pierre Laurin Award for Excellence in Research 2007 
 Roger Charbonneau Award 2013 
 Best Paper Award Econometrics 
 Statistical Society of Canada Gold Medalist 2019
 Fellow of the Institute of Mathematical Statistics 2019

References

External links

 Personal Webpage
 

1961 births
Living people
French Quebecers
Canadian mathematicians
Canadian statisticians
Elected Members of the International Statistical Institute
Fellows of the Institute of Mathematical Statistics
People from Montmagny, Quebec
Presidents of the Statistical Society of Canada
Université Laval alumni
Carleton University alumni
Cornell University alumni
Academic staff of the Université du Québec à Trois-Rivières
Academic staff of HEC Montréal